Emily King (born July 10, 1985) is an American singer and songwriter. She started her career in 2004 and her first album East Side Story was released in August 2007. In December 2007, King was listed as a Grammy nominee for Best Contemporary R&B Album. In 2019 Emily King was nominated for Best R&B Song for the 62nd Grammy Awards and her album Scenery was nominated for Best Engineered Album, Non-Classical. In 2020 Emily King was nominated again, this time for the category of Best R&B Performance for her song "See Me".

Biography
Born in New York City in 1985, King grew up in a small apartment on the Lower East Side. Her parents, Marion Cowings and Kim Kalesti, were a singing duo who performed and traveled regularly taking her and her older brother with them. At age 16, King left high school after earning her GED to pursue her music career. She began playing shows in restaurants and venues around New York City including CBGB and The Bitter End.

Career
King signed her first record deal with J Records in 2004 and appeared on Nas' 2004 album Street's Disciple credited as simply "Emily". Her first album East Side Story was released in August 2007. It received a Grammy nomination for Best Contemporary R&B Album of the Year. After leaving the label in 2008, King continued her work independently with producer Jeremy Most. She self-recorded her follow-up EP Seven in her home, released in July 2011. Throughout this time, King toured domestically and internationally with many artists including Nas, John Legend, Floetry, Alicia Keys, Chaka Khan, Erykah Badu, and Maroon 5.

In 2012, King was awarded the Holly Prize (a tribute to the legacy of Buddy Holly) from The Songwriters Hall of Fame for recognition of the "all-in songwriter" whose work exhibits the qualities of Holly’s music: true, great and original. In the fall, King was invited by Emeli Sandé to open for her UK tour playing sold out shows in five cities including at The Royal Albert Hall in London. King collaborated with José James on his album No Beginning No End in 2013 and can be heard on the tracks "Heaven on the Ground" and the acoustic version of "Come to My Door". In 2014, King performed as an opening act for Sara Bareilles' Little Black Dress tour.

King's second studio album, The Switch, was self-released by her own label, Making Music Records, on 26 June 2015. The Wall Street Journal remarked that the album is "a tasteful collection of eleven songs that showcase King’s distinctive voice".

She signed with the independent label ATO Records in 2017 and with them released her third studio album, Scenery, on 1 February 2019.

In late 2019, King once again performed as an opening act for Sara Bareilles in her Amidst The Chaos Tour.

In 2019, King helped to compose "Being Human", the ending theme song for the Cartoon Network animated series Steven Universe Future, which she sang. Her song "Can't Hold Me" was also used in an episode of the series.

King released her fourth studio album, Sides, on January 17, 2020. The album features acoustic takes on her previous songs, and includes a guest appearance by Sara Bareilles on the track "Teach You." In response to racial unrest in the summer of 2020, King released the song "See Me" in August. The song was nominated for Best R&B Performance in the 63rd Annual Grammy Awards.

King appeared on stream with Marc Rebillet on March 21, 2021 as his first ever guest performer.

Discography

Studio albums

EPs

Instrumental albums

Singles

As lead artist

As featured artist

Guest appearances

Awards and nominations

Tours

Headlining
The Switch Tour (2015–16)
You and I Tour (2017)
Scenery Tour (2019)
Ever After Tour (2021–22)

Supporting
Hands All Over Tour  (2011)
Our Version of Events Tour  (2012–13)
Amidst the Chaos Tour  (2019)

References

External links
Official website

1985 births
African-American women singer-songwriters
American soul musicians
American people of Italian descent
J Records artists
Living people
Singers from New York City
21st-century American women singers
American contemporary R&B singers
21st-century American singers
ATO Records artists
21st-century African-American women singers
20th-century African-American people
Singer-songwriters from New York (state)
20th-century African-American women